Season 2016–17 saw Greenock Morton compete in the Scottish Championship the second tier of Scottish football, having finished fifth in 2015-16. Morton also competed in the Challenge Cup, Scottish League Cup and the Scottish Cup.

Story of the season

May
Manager Jim Duffy signed a new two-year deal after successfully keeping the team in the Championship and reaching two cup quarter-finals.

Lee Kilday, Jon Scullion and Ricki Lamie were confirmed as having signed new contracts.

Dylan Stevenson, John Mitchell, John Tennent, Thomas Orr, Jamie McGowan and Conor Pepper all agreed new deals. Meanwhile, Peter MacDonald left the club for a second time, to join Clyde.

The other four senior players at the club, Stefan McCluskey, Michael Miller, Joe McKee and Andy McNeil were offered contracts.

Six of the club's under-17 side made the step up to the full-time development squad.

Derek Allan took a year off from coaching the club's under-17 side.

The new coaching line-ups for the 2016–17 season were announced, with Livingston defender Sean Crighton and Thomas O'Ware coaching the club's under-15s.

Morton gave their fans the chance to vote for a new strip after an Ajax-style strip was overwhelmingly rejected by the support. The vote would go public on 27 May.

Michael Miller left to sign with newly relegated Livingston.

Craig McPherson signed a two-year deal to stay on as Jim Duffy's assistant.

Joe McKee signed for Carlisle United, whilst full-back Michael Doyle joined from St Johnstone.

June
The new strip was announced as being blue and white hoops with yellow sidings.

Morton found out that they would open their season with an away trip in the Betfred Cup to Albion Rovers.

Jim Duffy signed his nephew Gary Oliver on a two-year deal from Queen of the South for a nominal fee after he rejected terms at QotS as well as Plymouth Argyle and St Mirren.

The new format of the Challenge Cup was announced, with Morton due to start in the third round instead of the first as in previous years.

The fixture lists were released on 17 June, with a derby match away to St Mirren being announced as the first game of the season.

Morton took three players in on trial including Kidderminster midfielder Reece Hales. Hales's trial was ended along with an unnamed Dutch trialist, but Jamie McDonagh's trial was extended. McDonagh was then offered a contract with the club, with the club expecting to hear back soon afterwards.

July
Morton's chief executive Gillian Donaldson quit the club after 15 years.

After a short trial, Morton signed Jamie McDonagh from Sheffield United and Caolan McAleer from Airdrie.

Thomas Orr was loaned out to Livingston.

Morton sign Celtic starlet Jamie Lindsay on loan for the season.

Morton were given a second round tie away at Hamilton Accies in the League Cup.

August

After a successful trial in a friendly against Kilbirnie Ladeside, Morton signed English striker Kudus Oyenuga on a one-year contract.

Aidan Nesbitt signed on loan on 9 August.

After defeating Hamilton Accies, Morton were given a quarter-final home tie against Dundee United.

Dylan Stevenson left the club by mutual consent to join Junior side Auchinleck Talbot.

Morton received a trip to Hampden Park in the third-round of the Challenge Cup, drawing Queen's Park away.

Alex McWaters joined Largs Thistle on loan until January. John Tennent also went out on loan to Lowland League side Cumbernauld Colts.

Thomas Orr was recalled from his loan deal at Livingston.

On the last day of the transfer window, Morton rejected an offer for Jai Quitongo from Doncaster Rovers.

September
Morton signed Irish centre-back Gavin Gunning on a short-term deal.

Winger Scott Tiffoney and full-back Lewis Strapp signed new deals to tie them to the club until summer 2018.

Morton reached the semi-final of the Scottish League Cup for the first time since 1981 beating Dundee United to reach Hampden to face Aberdeen.

Central midfielder Andy Murdoch joined the club.

Morton's development squad were drawn at home to Banks O' Dee in the Scottish Youth Cup third round.

October
Morton received an away draw against Junior side Beith Juniors in the third round of the Scottish Cup.

Alongside Aidan Nesbitt who won his first cap earlier in the season; Jai Quitongo received his first call-up to the Scotland U21 call-up.

November
After a convincing win over Banks O' Dee in the third round of the Scottish Youth Cup, Morton received an away tie against Motherwell in the fourth.

John Tennent was recalled from his loan spell at Broadwood Stadium.

Scott Tiffoney joined League Two side Clyde on loan until January.

Thomas O'Ware was named October's player of the month, and Jim Duffy named as manager of the month.

Andy Murdoch extended his contract until the end of the season.

December
Morton defeated Beith Juniors 6-0 to progress to a fourth round meeting with Falkirk.

Development squad defender John Mitchell made a short-term loan switch to local side Greenock Juniors.

Caolan McAleer was allowed to leave the club early and return to Northern Ireland.

Jon Scullion signed until the end of the season.

A red tartan effort was chosen by fan vote to be the new away strip for next season.

Kudus Oyenuga signed a contract extension until the end of the season.

January
John Tennent was released at the end of his short-term contract, as Scott Tiffoney returned from Clyde.

Andrew McNeil left the club to move into coaching with Guangzhou R&F.

Reserve team captain Ruaridh Langan joined Neilston Juniors on loan, whilst Alex McWaters spell at Largs Thistle was extended until the end of January.

Aidan Nesbitt's loan was extended until the end of the season.

Gavin Gunning left the club on the expiration of his short-term contract to sign for EFL League Two side Grimsby Town.

Warren Hawke was appointed chief executive of the club.

After his loan at St Mirren was terminated, Lawrence Shankland signed on loan from Aberdeen.

After defeating Falkirk in round 4, Morton were given an away tie against Rangers at Ibrox Stadium.

Blair Docherty signed his first professional contract, tying him to the club until the end of May.

Cappielow was announced as being the host for the Scotland U17 game against their Montenegran counterparts. The schoolboy international with England will also be played  at Cappielow.

Thomas Orr joined ex-Morton striker Aidan Ferris when he signed on loan at Alloa-based Scottish Lowland Football League side BSC Glasgow.

February
Ross Forbes won SPFL Championship Player of the Month for January 2017.

Morton signed a third player on loan from Celtic; long-time target, forward Luke Donnelly.

Dumbarton striker Robert Thomson signed a pre-contract agreement with the club.

March
Jai Quitongo signed a contract extension to keep him at the club for a further year.

April
Bryn Halliwell returned to the club on loan from Gartcairn Juniors to provide back-up to Derek Gaston.

Despite a serious downturn in form, Morton secured a playoff place thanks to other results going their way.

Ross Forbes was nominated for Championship Player of the Year.

May
Jim Duffy was nominated for SPFL Manager of the Year, alongside Brendan Rodgers, Alan Archibald and Derek McInnes.

Ross Forbes and Thomas O'Ware were selected in the PFA Scotland Championship Team of the Year.

Thomas Orr, Alex McWaters and John Mitchell were released. Meanwhile youngsters Jamie McGowan and Ben Armour signed one-year and six-month extensions respectively.

Four members of the first team squad were released; Kudus Oyenuga, Conor Pepper, Jon Scullion and Jamie McDonagh.

Jim Duffy was named as Championship Manager of the Season by league sponsors Ladbrokes.

First team transfers
From end of 2015-16 season, to last match of season 2016-17

In

Out

Fixtures and results

Friendlies

Scottish Championship

Scottish Premiership Playoffs

Scottish Cup

Scottish League Cup

Scottish Challenge Cup

Development squad

Friendlies

Development League West

Scottish Youth Cup

League table

Player statistics

All competitions

Development squad goalscorers

Including goals from the Development League West (runners-up) and SFA Youth Cup

Jon Scullion - 12
Thomas Orr - 8
Jack Purdue - 7
Scott Tiffoney - 6
Alex McWaters - 5
Ruaridh Langan - 4
Kudus Oyenuga, Lewis Strapp & Scott Miller - 3
Ben Armour, Jamie McDonagh, Caolan McAleer & John Tennent  - 2
Michael Tidser, Mitchell Duffy, John Mitchell, Blair Docherty, Ben Eardley & Conor Pepper - 1

Awards

Last updated 16 November 2016

References

Greenock Morton F.C. seasons
Greenock Morton